St Winwaloe's Church, Poundstock is a Grade I listed parish church in the Church of England in Poundstock, Cornwall.

History

The church was originally dedicated to St Winwaloe, but later this changed to St Neot. In the 1970s, the church re-adopted the dedication of St Winwaloe. The transept in the building dates from the 13th century, with the nave, aisle, chancel and west tower being late 15th century. It was restored by George Fellowes Prynne in 1896. Features of interest include the Gothic font (probably 13th century), the Jacobean pulpit, and three wall paintings on the north wall. These are much faded but interesting for their iconography: they are the Tree of Deadly Sins, the Warning to Sabbath-breakers and the Weighing of Souls.

The church has a one manual pipe organ but an electric organ is now played at services.

Parish status
The church is in a joint parish with
St Gregory's Church, Treneglos
St Werburgh's Church, Warbstow
St Anne's Church, Whitstone
Our Lady and St Anne's Church, Widemouth Bay
St Gennys’ Church, St Gennys
St James' Church, Jacobstow
St Mary the Virgin's Church, Week St Mary

References

Poundstock
Poundstock